XHUNES-TDT is an educational television station founded in 2008 by the Universidad España (Spanish University) in Durango, Mexico.

Dedicated to cultural and scientific diversity, XHUNES-TDT broadcasts 24 hours per day. Operated by university staff as well as degree students in various fields of communications, it operates as a teaching and educational facility and a sister station to XHUNES-FM 92.9 radio.

The first university television station in the state of Durango, XHUNES-TDT programming covers natural and social sciences as well as investigative journalism, serving as a laboratory for graduate and undergraduate students of the School of Communication Sciences in degree programs such as marketing, journalism, public relations & corporate image, and graphic design.

The station signed on in analog and converted to digital on physical channel 16, effective December 22, 2015. As a result of the expiration of the permit without renewal, the UNES received a second concession for XHPBDG-TDT on VHF channel 11, which became the new XHUNES-TDT in 2022.

Note

References 

Mass media in Durango City
Television stations in Durango
2008 establishments in Mexico
Television channels and stations established in 2008